Shane Ryan MBE (born 13 May 1969) is a British social reformer/activist, writer and formerly, the Chief Executive of Future Men, a charity supporting men and boys in the United Kingdom and also secretariat for the all-party parliamentary group (APPG) On Fatherhood. He was previously Deputy Director at the National Lottery Community Fund , and currently Global Executive Director of The Avast Foundation , a worldwide social impact organization.

Ryan is best known for his work in highlighting the plight of less affluent boys  in the British education system and teenaged fathers in the UK, as well as speaking nationally about support for unemployed young men  and his work related to fathers and families.
In 2018 in the wake of the Grenfell Tower fire, Ryan helped to set up and is currently the Chair of The Grenfell Children and Young Peoples Fund,  along with the Queens Park Rangers Trust and the Evening Standard newspaper.

References

External links
Working with Men

Midwife declares
CYP NOW-Engaging Fathers
Huffington Post
Diversity Awards
Shane Ryan Social Reformer in The Guardian 
New Radicals 2016
Evening Standard Shane Ryan Working With Men 2018

1969 births
Living people
Caribbean British
Black British writers
British people of Montserratian descent
British human rights activists
British charity and campaign group workers